"Sale of the Century" is a song by Britpop band Sleeper, written by the band's vocalist/guitarist Louise Wener and drummer Andy Maclure. In Europe, "Sale of the Century" was the second single to be released from their second album The It Girl in 1996 and became the group's first top ten hit on the UK Singles Chart.

Louise Wener said of the protagonist of "Sale of the Century": "Love makes you a little insane, yet rationality always kicks in. Dreamy persistence fascinates me, but so does powerlessness, ruined lives, and people who can't or don't get what they want."

"Sale of the Century" was backed with "Atomic", the band's cover of the Blondie hit single, recorded for the Trainspotting soundtrack.

Single release

In the United States, Arista positioned "Sale of the Century" as the lead-off single for the North American release of the album, submitting a radio edit of the track to alternative radio. Billboard magazine were quick to point out that the single and the band were distinctive from other Britpop acts by not borrowing from The Beatles. "Like all great Top 40 gems, this song has wit, lyrical power, melodic beauty, and a muscular backbeat", Larry Flick wrote in his Billboard review for "Sale of the Century", adding that the song was "one of the most thrilling summer singles for years". "Sale of the Century" preceded the release of The It Girl, which impacted stores across North America on 18 June 1996. Nevertheless, it still failed to reach any North American chart positions.

Track listings

 
 
UK 7" single Indolent SLEEP 011 (ltd no'd edition of 10,000; green vinyl)
UK cassette single Indolent SLEEP 011MC

"Sale of the Century" – 4:34
"Atomic"– 3:57

UK CD single Indolent SLEEP 011CD

"Sale of the Century" – 4:34
"Package Holiday" – 2:56
"Oh Well" – 2:10

EU CD maxi BMG 74321 36478-2
Australia CD single BMG 74321 36478-2

"Sale of the Century" – 4:34
"Package Holiday" – 2:56
"Oh Well" – 2:10
"Atomic"– 3:57

Comprehensive Charts

References

External links
"Sale of the Century" music video
Sleeper @ BBC Music
Sleeper release discography @ We Heart Music

1996 singles
Sleeper (band) songs
Song recordings produced by Stephen Street
Songs written by Louise Wener
1996 songs